The Petite rivière Savane (English: Little Savannah River) is a tributary of the Sainte-Anne River, flowing on the north bank of the Saint Lawrence River, in the territory unorganized from Lac-Jacques-Cartier, in the La Côte-de-Beaupré Regional County Municipality, in the administrative region of Capitale-Nationale, in the province of Quebec, in Canada.

This small valley is served on each side of the river by various forest roads. Forestry is the main economic activity in this valley; recreational tourism, second.

The surface of the Petite Savane River is generally frozen from the beginning of December until the end of March; however, safe traffic on the ice is generally from mid-December to mid-March. The upper part has a freezing period of about an additional week. The water level of the river varies with the seasons and the precipitation; the spring flood occurs in March or April.

Geography 
The Petite Rivière Savane rises at the confluence of three mountain streams, on the west side of Mont Bleu, in the unorganized territory of Lac-Jacques-Cartier. This source of the eastern flank of Mont Raoul-Blanchard, is located at:
  east of the course of the Brûlée River;
  south-east of the summit of Mont Raoul-Blanchard;
  south-west of the summit of Mont Bleu;
  south-west of the mouth of the Petite rivière Savane.

The course of this river bypasses Mont Bleu from the north.
  first towards the east, then towards the northeast by crossing an unidentified lake enclosed between the mountains, to its mouth;

The Petite rivière Savane flows on the southwest shore of the Sainte-Anne River (Beaupré), in the unorganized territory of Lac-Jacques-Cartier, facing the northern limit of Saint-Tite-des-Caps.

From the confluence of the Petite Savane River, the current flows over  generally towards the southwest by the course of the Sainte-Rivière Anne, which crosses downtown Beaupré, to the northwest shore of the Saint Lawrence River.

Toponymy 
The toponym "Petite rivière Savane" was formalized on March 25, 1997 at the Place Names Bank of the Commission de toponymie du Québec.

References

See also 

 Capitale-Nationale, an administrative region
 La Côte-de-Beaupré Regional County Municipality
 Lac-Jacques-Cartier, an unorganized territory
 Sainte-Anne River (Beaupré)
 St. Lawrence River
 List of rivers of Quebec

Rivers of Capitale-Nationale
La Côte-de-Beaupré Regional County Municipality